John Throckmorton may refer to:
Sir John Throckmorton (died 1580) (by 1524–1580), lawyer and MP for Leicester, Camelford, Warwick, Old Sarum, and Coventry
John L. Throckmorton, US Army general
John Throckmorton (MP for Worcestershire) (died 1445), MP for Worcestershire in 1414, 1420, 1422, 1433 and 1439;
John Throckmorton (of Lypiatt) (1572–1623), MP for Gloucestershire in 1601 and 1604
John Throckmorton (settler) (1601–1684), early settler of Providence Plantation
Sir John Throckmorton (died 1624), English soldier and governor of Vlissingen